Lucas Rafael Araújo Lima (born 9 July 1990), known as Lucas Lima, is a Brazilian professional footballer who plays as an attacking midfielder for Santos.

Club career

Inter de Limeira
Born in Marília, São Paulo, Lucas Lima finished his formation with Inter de Limeira, joining their youth setup in 2009, after being released by Rio Preto and América-SP. He was promoted to the former's main squad in 2010.

Lucas Lima made his senior debut on 16 May 2010, starting in a 2–1 home win against Brasilis. He scored his first senior goal on 30 May 2010, netting the second in a 3–0 away win against Palmeirinha.

In August 2011 Lucas Lima had a trial at La Liga side Racing de Santander, but nothing came of it.

Internacional
In July 2012, Lucas Lima joined SC Internacional, initially assigned with the under-23 squad. After being promoted to the first team, he made his debut for Colorado on 15 July, starting in a 0–0 home draw against Santos FC. He appeared in 14 matches during the season, with only four starts, however.

Loan to Sport Recife
On 5 March 2013, Lucas Lima joined Sport Recife on loan until the end of the season. He soon established himself as a starter, and appeared in 46 matches (36 in the league), scoring nine times.

Santos

On 7 February 2014, Lucas Lima signed a four-year deal with Santos, for a R$5 million fee. He made his debut for the club late in the month, in a 5–0 home routing over Bragantino, and scored his first goal on 7 March, in a 5–2 away success against Mogi Mirim.

After the departure of Cícero to Fluminense, Lucas Lima became the club's first-choice, and scored his first Série A goal on 29 May, in a 2–0 away win against Bahia. He finished the campaign with 35 league appearances and three goals, being now a key unit for the club.

Lucas Lima scored the decisive penalty for Santos in 2015 Campeonato Paulista final, netting the fourth in a 4–2 shootout win over Palmeiras. He was also included in the tournament's best eleven. He completed his 100th game for the club on 18 October of that year, starting in a 3–1 home win against Goiás, and finished the year with four league goals in 30 appearances.

Lucas Lima failed to maintain the high standards of the previous campaign during the 2016 season; hampered by injuries in the year's Paulistão (in which he was still elected Best player), the constant call ups to the national team also impeded his recovery at the club. He still scored a direct free kick in a 3–0 home win against rivals São Paulo on 26 June.

After the departure of Gabriel to Internazionale, Lucas Lima was assigned the number 10 jersey. He made his Copa Libertadores debut on 9 March 2017, starting and assisting Thiago Maia's goal in a 1–1 away draw against Sporting Cristal; he was also elected the Man of the match.

Despite playing regularly during the year, Lucas Lima only scored one league goal during the campaign (in a 2–0 home win against rivals Corinthians); he was also the player with the highest number of bookable offences during the competition. After refusing the renewal offer from the club, he was separated from the first team on 21 November 2017.

Palmeiras

On 30 November 2017, Lucas Lima signed a pre-contract with Santos' rival Palmeiras, effective as of 1 January. He was regularly used during the 2018 and 2019 seasons, scoring six goals in 2018.

On 18 April 2021, after losing space after the arrival of manager Abel Ferreira, Lucas Lima's manager Alessio Sundas, announced that the player was on its way to Inter Miami, David Beckham's team playing in the America's Major League Soccer, but nothing came of it.

Loan to Fortaleza
On 25 August 2021, Lucas Lima was loaned to fellow top tier side Fortaleza until the end of the year. The following 12 January, his loan was extended for a further season, meaning that he would not return to Palmeiras as his contract would expire at the end of the year.

Return to Santos
On 7 February 2023, Lucas Lima returned to Santos on a contract until the end of the 2023 Campeonato Paulista. He made his re-debut for the club nine days later, starting in a 1–1 Campeonato Paulista away draw against Santo André.

International career
On 13 August 2015, Lucas Lima was called up to Brazil national team by manager Dunga for friendlies against Costa Rica and United States. He made his full international debut for Brazil on 5 September, starting in a 1–0 win against Costa Rica at the Red Bull Arena in Harrison, New Jersey.

Lucas Lima scored his first goal for Brazil in the 2018 FIFA World Cup qualifiers against Argentina, securing a 1–1 tie. On 5 May 2016, he was named among the 23-man list for the Copa América Centenario to be held in the United States. He came off the bench in matches against Ecuador and Haiti, scoring the fifth goal in the 7–1 routing of the latter, and started the last match of the group stage, a 0–1 loss (and eventual elimination) against Peru.

Career statistics

Club

International

International goals
Scores and results list Brazil's goal tally first.

Honours

Club
Santos
Campeonato Paulista: 2015, 2016
Palmeiras
Campeonato Brasileiro Série A: 2018
Campeonato Paulista: 2020
Copa Libertadores: 2020, 2021
Copa do Brasil: 2020
Fortaleza
Copa do Nordeste: 2022
Campeonato Cearense: 2022

Individual
 Campeonato Pernambucano Best midfielder: 2013
 Campeonato Paulista Team of the year: 2015, 2016, 2018
 Campeonato Paulista Best Player: 2016
 Copa Libertadores top assist provider: 2017

References

External links

Santos official profile 

1990 births
Living people
People from Marília
Brazilian footballers
Association football midfielders
Campeonato Brasileiro Série A players
Campeonato Brasileiro Série B players
Associação Atlética Internacional (Limeira) players
Sport Club Internacional players
Sport Club do Recife players
Santos FC players
Sociedade Esportiva Palmeiras players
Fortaleza Esporte Clube players
Brazil international footballers
Copa América Centenario players
Footballers from São Paulo (state)